The cloister is cocktail made from gin, grapefruit juice, lemon juice, and chartreuse. The cocktail includes chartreuse, and has been cited as a good introduction to the herbal-infused liqueur.

See also
 List of cocktails

References

External links
 

Cocktails with gin
Cocktails with grapefruit juice
Cocktails with lemon juice
Cocktails with chartreuse